Bonnie Lake is a small freshwater lake located in the Alpine Lakes Wilderness, south of Otter Lake and the Necklace Valley lakes in King County, Washington. Two waterfalls are found neighboring the lake, one at the eastern inflow and the other at the western outflow: Upper and Lower Bonnie Lake Falls respectively.  A short distance towards the South are Iron Cap Mountain and Iron Cap Lake. Bonnie Lake is surrounded by forests except on the eastern side, which is largely composed of vegetated bedrock, talus, and avalanche tracks. Self-issued Alpine Lake Wilderness permit required for transit within the Necklace Valley area.

See also 
 List of lakes of the Alpine Lakes Wilderness

References 

Lakes of King County, Washington
Lakes of the Alpine Lakes Wilderness
Okanogan National Forest